Raymond Edward Hitchcock (28 November 1929 – 8 September 2019) was a New Zealand first-class cricketer who played in England for Warwickshire. 

Hitchcock was a left-handed batsman who also bowled right-arm leg-spin. He played two games in New Zealand for Canterbury in 1947–48 before moving to England. Between 1949 and 1964 he scored 12,269 runs for Warwickshire and took 182 wickets. He made his highest score against Derbyshire in 1962 when he went to the wicket with Warwickshire at 50 for 4 and scored 153 not out in just under two and a half hours out of a team total of 280. His best bowling figures came in the match against Scotland in 1959 when he took 7 for 76 and 3 for 27.

References

External links
 
Ray Hitchcock at CricketArchive

1929 births
2019 deaths
Cricketers from Christchurch
New Zealand cricketers
Warwickshire cricketers
Canterbury cricketers
Commonwealth XI cricketers
A. E. R. Gilligan's XI cricketers